Leslie John Lenham (born 24 May 1936) is an English former cricketer who played first-class cricket for Sussex from 1956 to 1970. He appeared in 300 first-class matches as a right-handed batsman who occasionally bowled off breaks. He scored 12,796 runs with a highest score of 191 not out among seven centuries and took six wickets with a best performance of two for 24.

References

Sources
 John Wallace, 100 Greats – Sussex County Cricket Club, Tempus, 2002

External links
 

1936 births
English cricketers
Sussex cricketers
Living people
Sportspeople from Worthing